Poway is a city in San Diego County, California, United States. The unincorporated community became a city on December 1, 1980.  Poway's rural roots influenced its motto "The City in the Country". The city has a population of 49,701 as of 2019.

Poway is considered part of San Diego's North County.

History
The Kumeyaay people lived in the area for centuries before the Spanish colonization of the region. Artifacts such as arrowheads, spear points, metates, grinding stones, and pottery found along the bed of Poway Creek all indicate an early Kumeyaay presence. Various pictographs adorn many of Poway's boulders, and modern dating techniques suggest these paintings date to the 16th century and earlier.  The name "Poway" is a Kumeyaay term meaning "arrowhead" or "watering hole".

European settlement
In the late 18th century, the Mission San Diego de Alcalá kept cattle in the valley. Documents of Mission San Diego de Alcala record the name of the valley as "Paguay" as early as 1828. Though there is a discrepancy on the exact translation of "Paguay," the generally accepted version indicates "the meeting of little valleys" or "end of the valley." Some controversy also surrounds the proper spelling; historically it has also been written by the Mexican authorities as Paguai. It has also been written as Paui, Pauai, Pauy, and Powaii.

For approximately a century, Poway served as a stock range for the mission and local ranchos. In September 1839, Corporal Rosario Aguilar was granted Rancho Paguai a ranch in the valley and it was confirmed on May 22, 1840, but he refused it, becoming Juez de paz in 1841 and moving instead to San Juan Capistrano.

American settlement
American settlers began to come to the valley for farming purposes in the late antebellum period. Few records of this time have survived, and not until 1894 and the inception of the Poway Progress did the town's history become a thing of record. In 1887, about 800 people lived and farmed in Poway. Around the start of the 20th century, Poway farmers had moderate success in the production and vending of fruit, grain, and dairy products. The expansion, however, failed to follow agricultural success.

Poway has a creek and fertile soil, but the lack of easily available water prevented the settlement from attracting large-scale farmers and the accompanying population growth. In 1954 the Poway Municipal Water District was established to utilize water from the Colorado River Aqueduct. In 1957, following the sewer system's completion, developers built housing tracts.

In 1980 Poway incorporated and was nicknamed "the City in the Country". Poway no longer relies on agriculture for its primary source of income and has instead transitioned into a residential community for those who work for employers in and around the San Diego area. According to a recent state government estimate, the population of Poway has grown since that last census to 50,542. It has been designated a "Tree City" for the last decade.

Major portions of the town were evacuated during both the 2003 Cedar Fire and 2007 Witch Creek Fire.

In 2004, the City of Poway adopted the 1st Light Armored Reconnaissance Battalion, 1st Marine Division, based out of nearby Camp Pendleton. The Fred L. Kent Post 7907 of the Veterans of Foreign Wars has been the official go-between with the battalion, which has been redeployed at least once to Iraq since its adoption.

The pop-punk bands Blink-182, Unwritten Law, Pivit and The Frights originated in Poway, California.

Agriculture
The Homestead Act of 1862 encouraged Westward migration, and many of Poway's first white settlers came to farm. The fecund soil proved well-suited to a variety of crops, including peaches, Muscat grapes, apricots, pears, hay, and alfalfa. Some farmers captured swarms of wild bees and cultivated honey. Dairying also proved lucrative. Most families kept a cow for milk and butter, chickens for eggs and meat, and perhaps a hog to sustain them while they farmed. Crops sold well around the San Diego area. Between the seasons of 1894 and 1896, the Poway Progress reported agricultural information:

Muscat grapes are beginning to ripen, and the San Diego market is getting a supply of the fine article Poway always produces. ... The season has been a prolific one for bees, thirty of forty stands the present season from a single captured swarm a year or two ago. ... The peach is a good article, and Poway produces it to perfection. Poway pears will compare with any grown in the state.

The success of these crops depended on the annual winter rainfall, and remained subject to variations in precipitation until the establishment of the Poway Municipal Water District in 1954. With water readily available, the town's farming interest shifted to two principal crops: avocados and citrus fruits. With water came new residents, and the former farm town transformed into a locale full of small commercial businesses and shopping centers.

Religion
The Community Church of Poway, the town's first church, has remained in operation since 1887, making it the house of worship with the longest continual operation in San Diego County. Living Way Church, a non-denominational Protestant church, through Berean Bible College, is the only church currently in Poway that offers bible college classes. There are two Catholic churches in Poway, St. Michael's and St. Gabriel's.

There is a Jewish community, with a Reform synagogue, a Conservative synagogue, and an Orthodox synagogue. On April 27, 2019, the Orthodox synagogue, Chabad of Poway, was the site of an attack in which multiple people were shot—one of whom was killed—during Passover services.

A Sikh temple, one of several in San Diego County, is found in Poway. Two Kingdom Halls of Jehovah's Witnesses are located in Poway. There are nine congregations of the Church of Jesus Christ of Latter-day Saints located in Poway that meet in three meetinghouses.

Education
Poway established its school district in 1871, but did not have a schoolhouse until 1885, when a one-room school was built at Midland Road about a 2–3-minute walk south of the Templar's Hall. The site is still in use today as an elementary school (Kindergarten through 5th grade), though it was torn down and rebuilt in 1945, and renovated again in 2004–2006. First through eighth graders were included in one classroom. Children learned to read and write using slates, and eventually progressed to study subjects such as arithmetic, spelling, English, language (German or Latin), grammar, history, and geography. Students did not usually attend high school, and had to travel to Escondido if they wished to do so. In 1909, only three students from Poway graduated from high school. Women who went on to more school from there usually had teaching ambitions. Education, while compulsory and considered a worthwhile pastime, had few far-reaching applications for Poway's farmers' children. Enrollment in the Poway School 1st–8th grades did not reach 100 until 1932.

Transportation
Poway's transportation history parallels that of early California. In 1888 the first stagecoach began to service the towns from San Diego to Escondido, including Poway. The stage made one stop in town, at the Poway Post Office, and also delivered mail to the farmers who would wait along the road for its arrival. The men would trot alongside the coach and inquire as to the state of the mail, and thus receive letters without requiring it to stop. Eight to ten passengers could accompany the stagecoach on its three-day journey for a modest $1.00 fee, or purchase a round trip for the bargain price of $1.50. The route itself, though not treacherous when passing through Poway, did pose a significant challenge to the team and driver at various points. Windy mountain trails often caused the stage to turn over, spilling both mail and passengers onto the rocky turf. The city of San Diego discontinued the stage line in 1912, when the advent of the automobile facilitated an easier and less time-consuming method of mail delivery. Poway established a County Road Station in 1920, to oil and maintain the roads so that automobiles could use them with ease. The road station remained in operation until 1961, when Poway achieved an 80% paved road rate. To this day, though, the town still boasts a number of dirt roads, for use by cars, horses, bikers, and pedestrians. Portions of what is currently Pomerado Road, a major north/south artery, were once U.S. Route 395 in California.

Water
Poway's greatest change started in the 1950s when water came to the valley. On January 29, 1954, an election was held on the formation of the Poway Municipal Water District, which passed with an overwhelming majority of 210 ayes to 32 nays. At the second election on March 25, 1954, the citizens voted to annex to the San Diego County Water Authority. At a third election held April 22, 1954, the citizens voted to incur bonded debt of $600,000 to build a water system. The first water delivery was made in July 1954 to Gordon's Grocery on Garden Road. In 1972 Poway Dam was built to provide a dependable supply of water.

In 1957, the Pomerado County Water District was organized to provide sewer service to  along Pomerado Road. In 1959 the first subdivision homes were built and sold as Poway Valley Homes and Poway's population began to climb. On December 1, 1980, the City of Poway incorporated and the two districts, Poway Municipal Water and Pomerado County Water, became part of the City structure. The district issued a restriction for watering lawns. It allowed people to water their lawns three days a week each week. After a year or two, these restrictions were lifted.

Geography
Poway is north of the city of San Diego and south of the city of Escondido. Nearby communities include Rancho Bernardo, Sabre Springs, Scripps Ranch, Rancho Peñasquitos, and Ramona to the east.

The confluence of the 33rd parallel north and 117th meridian west is located on a hillside in a private property.

Climate
Poway has a borderline semi-arid climate (Köppen: Bsh) and hot-summer Mediterranean climate (Köppen: Csa) with hot summers and cool wet winters.

Demographics

2010
The 2010 United States Census reported that Poway had a population of 47,811. The racial makeup of Poway was 36,781 (76.9%) White, 783 (1.6%) African American, 265 (0.6%) Native American, 4,853 (10.2%) Asian, 106 (0.2%) Pacific Islander, 2,944 (6.2%) from other races, and 2,079 (4.3%) from two or more races. Hispanic or Latino people of any race numbered 7,508 (15.7%).

The Census reported that 47,261 people (98.8% of the population) lived in households, 284 (0.6%) lived in non-institutionalized group quarters, and 266 (0.6%) were institutionalized.

There were 16,128 households, out of which 6,493 (40.3%) had children under the age of 18 living in them, 10,523 (65.2%) were opposite-sex married couples living together, 1,675 (10.4%) had a female householder with no husband present, 742 (4.6%) had a male householder with no wife present. There were 580 (3.6%) unmarried opposite-sex partnerships, and 111 (0.7%) same-sex married couples or partnerships; 2,469 households (15.3%) were made up of individuals, and 1,185 (7.3%) had someone living alone who was 65 years of age or older. The average household size was 2.93. There were 12,940 families (80.2% of all households); the average family size was 3.23.

The population was spread out, with 11,948 people (25.0%) under the age of 18, 3,912 people (8.2%) aged 18 to 24, 10,496 people (22.0%) aged 25 to 44, 15,555 people (32.5%) aged 45 to 64, and 5,900 people (12.3%) who were 65 years of age or older. The median age was 41.3 years. For every 100 females, there were 97.1 males. For every 100 females age 18 and over, there were 94.5 males.

The homeowner vacancy rate was 1.1%; the rental vacancy rate was 5.5%. 35,111 people (73.4% of the population) lived in owner-occupied housing units and 12,150 people (25.4%) lived in rental housing units.

2000
According to the census of 2000, there were 48,044 people, 15,467 households, and 12,868 families residing in the city. The population density was 1,224.8 inhabitants per square mile (473.0/km2). The racial makeup of the city was 82.85% White, 7.46% Asian, 1.67% African American, 0.48% Native American, 0.28% Pacific Islander, 3.27% from other races, and 3.99% from two or more races. Across all races 10.35% are Hispanic or Latino.

There were 15,467 households, out of which 47.0% had children under the age of 18 living with them, 68.8% were married couples living together, 10.5% have an unmarried female householder, and 16.8% were non-families. Of all households, 12.6%  were made up of individuals, and 4.7% had someone living alone who was 65 years of age or older. The average household size was 3.08 people and the average family size was 3.35 people.

In the city, the population was spread out, with 30.7% under the age of 18, 7.1% from 18 to 24, 28.1% from 25 to 44, 25.5% from 45 to 64, and 8.6% who were 65 years of age or older. The median age was 37 years. For every 100 females, there were 97.0 males. For every 100 females age 18 and over, there were 93.9 males.

The median income for a household in Poway is $92,083, and the median income for a family was $103,972, making it the 25th most expensive zip code in the United States (as of a 2007 estimate). Males had a median income of $53,322 versus $52,742 for females. The per capita income for the city was $29,788. About 3.1% of families and 4.3% of the population were below the poverty line, including 4.9% of those under age 18 and 3.7% of those age 65 or over.

According to estimates by the San Diego Association of Governments, the median household income of Poway in 2005 was $96,474 (not adjusted for inflation). When adjusted for inflation (1999 dollars; comparable to Census data above), the median household income was $78,340.

Economy

Top employers
According to the City's 2019 Comprehensive Annual Financial Report, the top ten employers in the city are:

Parks and recreation

 Aubrey Park
 Blue Sky Ecological Reserve
 Old Poway Park (home to Poway-Midland Railroad and Poway Historical and Memorial Society)
 Starridge Park
 Poway Community Park
 Lake Poway

Hiking trails

 Interpretive Center at Pauwai
 Sycamore Canyon Preserve and Goodan Ranch
 City of Poway Trails

Government
Poway incorporated as a general law city in December 1980. Like most California cities, it uses a council/manager form of government. City policies are set by a five-member city council which includes a directly-elected mayor. The mayor and councilmembers are elected at-large to overlapping four-year terms. Council appoints the deputy mayor, the city attorney, and the city manager.

State and federal representation

Education
Presently, the Poway Unified School District (PUSD) has grown to 25 elementary (Kindergarten to 5th grade), six middle (6th–8th grades), six high (9th–12th grades) schools, a home-schooling program, and a K–8 school. PUSD has a record of high performance, and one of its students, Anurag Kashyap (an eighth-grader at the time), became the 2005 National Spelling Bee champion after winning on the word "appoggiatura". Poway Adult School was established in 1963 by the Poway Unified School District. Poway Adult School is a provider of adult education services in the City of Poway and its surrounding communities. Poway Adult School offers adult education courses for adults in the areas of: high school diploma, GED, HISET, adult basic education, ESL, parenting classes, community education courses, and career technical education courses (CTE). Poway Adult School also offers a robust selection of short-term CTE courses such as: Certified Nurse Assistant, Real Estate, Court Reporting, Financing, and Computers. Poway Adult School offers a wide-range of community education courses for the community such as yoga, music classes and much more. Poway Adult School is a member of the Education to Career Network of North San Diego County. ETCN is one of 71 Consortiums in the State of California and is funded by the California Adult Education Program.

Poway High School

Poway High School operates as part of the Poway Unified School District. The school's teams, the Titans, participate in wrestling, lacrosse, baseball, softball, water polo, football, cross country, and 11 other sports.

Berean Bible College

Berean Bible College is a Charismatic Christian bible college located within Living Way Church. The college claims educational accreditation through the Accrediting Commission International for Schools, Colleges and Theological Seminaries, an unrecognized accrediting organization based previously in Beebe, Arkansas, now based in Sarasota, Florida. The college is also recognized by the U.S. Immigration and Customs Enforcement's Student and Exchange Visitor Program (SEVIS) to issue I-20 foreign student visas. The college awards associate's degrees, diplomas, and bachelor's degrees. The current president of the college is Rev. Douglas Balcombe and its current dean is Rev. Bobby San-Miguel.

Infrastructure
San Diego Metropolitan Transit System (MTS) operates public transportation in the City of Poway. MTS routes 944 and 945 connect the city to the Sabre Springs and Rancho Bernardo transit centers.

Notable people

 Brian Awadis, YouTube personality star, known as FaZe Rug
 Bruce Bochy, former Major League Baseball catcher and manager of the San Diego Padres and San Francisco Giants
 Fletcher Bowron, mayor of Los Angeles 1938–53
 Tom Brunansky, former Major League Baseball outfielder
 Lloyd M. Bucher, U.S. naval officer, commanding officer of USS Pueblo (AGER-2)
 Jeromy Burnitz, former Major League Baseball outfielder
 David Buttolph, American film composer who scored over 300 movies[1] and TV shows in his career
 Brandon Call, actor, Step By Step, Baywatch Luis Castillo, former defensive end for the San Diego Chargers
 Tom DeLonge, guitarist/singer of the rock band Blink-182, also known for Box Car Racer and Angels & Airwaves
Alex Dickerson (born 1990), Major League Baseball outfielder for the Atlanta Braves
 Lauren Elaine, celebrity fashion designer, actress, and model, known for her movie roles and appearances in Dierks Bentley's music videos
 Antonio Gates, former tight end for the San Diego/Los Angeles Chargers
 David Goeddel, biotechnology pioneer and acclaimed scientist
 Tony Gwynn, member of Baseball Hall of Fame, retired San Diego Padres star, and former manager of SDSU Aztecs baseball team
 Christy Hemme, actress, model, and former professional wrestler
 Charley Hoffman, PGA Tour professional golfer
 Mary Ann Horton, computer expert
 David Justice, former Major League Baseball outfielder
 Anurag Kashyap, winner of the 2005 Scripps National Spelling Bee and 2008 Teen Jeopardy Tournament
 Lorenzo Lamas, actor
 Bobby Lee, actor and stand-up comedian
 Shawne Merriman, former outside linebacker for the San Diego Chargers and Buffalo Bills
 Trevi Moran, singer and YouTube personality
 Phil Nevin, former Major League Baseball player for the San Diego Padres
 Shaun Phillips, former National Football League outside linebacker for the San Diego Chargers
 Kelsey Plum, professional basketball player for the San Antonio Stars in the WNBA
 Scott Raynor, original drummer of the rock band Blink-182
 Dave Rickards, radio host, Dave, Shelly, and Chainsaw Radio Show'', KGB-FM
 Mark Risley, Emmy-winning director
 Philip Rivers, former quarterback for the San Diego/Los Angeles Chargers
 Scott Simpson, former PGA golfer and 1987 U.S. Open Champion
 Jeff Smith, American player of gridiron football
 Michael Stelzner, founder and CEO of Social Media Examiner
 Jesse Taylor, MMA fighter
 Lindsay Taylor, professional basketball player
 LaDainian Tomlinson, former running back for the San Diego Chargers and the New York Jets
 Unwritten Law, punk rock band
 Steve Vaus (aka Buck Howdy), four-time Grammy Award nominee, 2010 Grammy winner; elected Mayor of Poway in 2014
 Nick Vincent (born 1986), Major League Baseball pitcher in the Minnesota Twins organization, former San Diego Padres player
 Matt Wilhelm, former National Football League middle linebacker for the San Diego Chargers

See also
 San Diego County, California

References

External links

 
 Poway Historical and Memorial Society website

 
Cities in San Diego County, California
Incorporated cities and towns in California
North County (San Diego County)
San Diego metropolitan area